Silver bromate (AgBrO3), is a toxic, light and heat-sensitive, white powder.

Uses
Silver bromate can be used as an oxidant for the transformation of tetrahydropyranyl ethers to carbonyl compounds.

References

External links
 Silver bromate solubility
 Chemical data

Bromates
Silver compounds
Oxidizing agents
Reagents for organic chemistry